Introduction to Leadership Skills for Troops (ILST) is a unit-level training program within the Boy Scouts of America led by the Scoutmaster and the Senior Patrol Leader. It is designed to improve the leadership skill of all boy leaders within a Boy Scout troop. This training is one of several programs available within the youth leadership training program.

Program content

Introduction to Leadership Skills for Troops replaced Troop Leadership Training (TLT) in 2010. TLT was preceded by the Scoutmaster Junior Leader Training Kit (No. 3422) superscript 3, in use from 1990 to 2003.  TLT is broken into three one-hour modules. The three sessions focus respectively on what a new Patrol Leader or Senior Patrol Leader must know, must be, and must do. When a Scout completes all three modules, he is qualified to wear the "Trained" patch on his shirtsleeve under his badge of office. The manual contains leadership position cards that define each position in the troop. Completion of TLT prepares the youth to attend National Youth Leadership Training.

The three one-hour modules are divided into three topics: It is organized into three one-hour modules, which can be taught individually or all in one session.

 Module One—Introduction to Leadership (Know) - Conducted within a week of a Scout's acceptance of his new position, this session focuses on what a boy leader must know. The manual directs the Scoutmaster to refer to the Scoutmaster Handbook, chapter 3, "The Boy-Led Troop.", and chapter 4. "The Boy-Led Patrol."
 Module Two—How to Fulfill Your Role (Be) - This session on how to fulfill the role's responsibilities focuses on what a leader must be. The program includes the Scoutmaster's "vision of success," a discussion of the "Teaching EDGE" method of instruction, and an evaluation of the troop's progress.
 Module Three—What Is Expected of Me? (Do) - This session focuses on what a leader must do. Topics include a review of the troop leader position descriptions, motivating Scouts to lead, what constitutes success in the boy's leadership role, and a coaching session with the Scoutmaster.

References

Bibliography

External links
 Introduction to Leadership Skills for Troops - Official Manual (2011 Version)
 Introduction to Leadership Skills for Troops - Official Manual (2017 Version)

Leadership training of the Boy Scouts of America